Kabokweni is a town in Ehlanzeni District Municipality in the Mpumalanga province of South Africa. It was established formally as a town in 1967, as the first town in the Kangwane bantustan.

History 
The history of Kabokweni is closely connected to apartheid policies of forced removals. The town was classified as being under the Kangwane bantustan, created by the apartheid state as the homeland of Swazi people in South Africa. Most people living in and around Kabokweni were forcibly moved up to three or more times. Many in Kabokweni were forcibly removed from White River, Mbombela (then Nelspruit) and surrounding farms, while others moved there more freely. 

According to Surplus People Project, soon after it was first declared a town 1970, Kabowkweni's population was 3310. By 1977, it was 7917.

Demography
During the national census of 2011 the 8.24 km2 town housed an estimated 21,905 inhabitants, of which 98,3% were Black South Africans with 82% speaking siSwati as their home language.

Health Services in Kabokweni 
There are private and public health services in Kabokweni. Public facilities include:

 Themba Hospital
 Bhuga Community Health Centre
 Gutshwa Clinic
 Khumbula Clinic
 Makoko Clinic
 Zwelisha Clinic

Private facilities include several general practitioners (medical doctors) and the more comprehensive Dr Ntandoyenkosi Memorial U-Care Medical Centre, a subsidiary of U-Care Medical Centres.

See also
Lowveld massacre

References

Populated places in the Mbombela Local Municipality